CMLL Super Viernes is professional wrestling promotion Consejo Mundial de Lucha Libre's (CMLL) Friday night wrestling show that takes place in Arena México every Friday night unless a Pay-Per-View or a major wrestling event is scheduled to take place on that night. CMLL began holding their weekly Friday night "Super Viernes" shows as far back as 1938, with 2012 being no exception. Some of the matches from Super Viernes are taped for CMLL's weekly shows that air in Mexico the week following the Super Viernes show. The Super Viernes show was replaced by four major CMLL events in 2010, Homenaje a Dos Leyendas, Infierno en el Ring, CMLL 77th Anniversary Show, Sin Piedad.

The CMLL World Heavyweight Championship (January 22), Mexican National Welterweight Championship (June 11), Mexican National Trios Championship (June 18), CMLL World Women's Championship (October 29) and the CMLL World Trios Championship (October 29) were successfully defended by the champions. Only one Lucha de Apuesta was held on a Super Viernes show in 2010, which featured Charly Manson defeating Negro Casas for the right to shave Warrior's hair off. The show traditionally hosts all the major tournaments, for 2011 that included the 2011 version of CMLL Torneo Nacional de Parejas Increibles, Torneo Gran Alternativa, Campeon Universal Del CMLL, Pequeños Reyes del Aire, La Copa Junior and the male version of the Copa Bicentenario tournaments. It also featured a one-night Trios tag-team tournament.

The shows featured 343 matches in total, 299 for the male division, 17 featuring the female division and 27 featuring the Mini-Estrellas. In 2009 148 different wrestlers appeared in matches during CMLL's Super Viernes shows. Of those 148 wrestlers 18 were Mini-Estrellas and 15 were women. La Sombra wrestled in 46 matches in total, the most of any individual wrestler, which meant that he appeared on in 15.4% of all matches. Marcela was the woman most often featured on Super Viernes with 10 matches, appearing in 58.8% of all women's matches booked for Super Viernes. Pequeño Black Warrior was the Mini-Estrella who had the most appearances, wrestling 21 times in total, or in 77.77% of all Mini-Estrella matches. Apolo Estrada Jr., Cholo, Latino, Nosferatu, Príncipe, Tony Rivera, Universo 2000, Villano IV, Ayumi, Dalys la Caribeña, Zeuxis and Tzuki all wrestled only on one Super Viernes during 2010.

Super Viernes shows of 2012

Notes

References

2010 in professional wrestling
Professional wrestling-related lists
2010